Games Wizards Play is the tenth novel in the Young Wizards series by Diane Duane and a sequel to A Wizard of Mars.

Plot
Every eleven years, Earth’s senior wizards hold the Invitational - an intensive three-week event where the planet’s newest, sharpest young wizards show off their best and hottest spells. Wizardly partners Kit Rodriguez and Nita Callahan, and Nita’s sister, former wizard-prodigy Dairine Callahan, are drafted in to mentor two brilliant and difficult cases: for Nita and Kit, Asian-American Penn Shao-Feng, a would-be sun-technician with a dangerous new take on managing solar weather: and for Dairine, shy young Mehrnaz Farrahi, an Iranian wizard-girl trying to specialize in defusing earthquakes while struggling with a toxic extended wizardly family that demands she overperform to their expectations... or fail.

Together they’re plunged into a whirlwind of cutthroat competition and ruthless judging: it’s “The Apprentice” with magic. Penn’s egotistical and misogynistic attitude toward Nita complicates matters as Nita and Kit work to negotiate their burgeoning boyfriend/girlfriend issues. Meanwhile, Dairine struggles to stabilize her hero-worshipping, insecure protégée against the interference of powerful wizard-relatives using her to further their own tangled agendas. When it finally comes time for the finals stage on the dark side of the Moon, both the new wizards and their mentors are both flung into a final conflict that could change the solar system for the better... or damage Earth beyond even wizardly repair.

Major Characters
Juanita Louise Callahan
Also known as "Nita", she is one of the main protagonists in the series. Nita is one of the mentors for Penn in the Invitational.

Christopher Rodriguez
Also known as "Kit", he is another of the main protagonists. Kit is the other mentor for Penn in the Invitational.

Dairine Callahan
Younger sister of Nita, and another main protagonist, she is the mentor of Mehrnaz.

Penn Shao-Feng
Nita and Kit's candidate for the Invitational. He tends to be arrogant and overconfident in his skills. He patronizes Nita, openly doubting her intelligence and her capability as a wizard.

Mehrnaz Farrahi
Dairine's candidate for the Invitational. Thanks in large part to her emotionally abusive family, she is shy and lacks confidence in her abilities.

References

External links
 Games Wizards Play on YoungWizards.com
 Young Wizards series at Harcourt

2016 fantasy novels
2016 American novels
American fantasy novels
American young adult novels
2016 children's books
Houghton Mifflin books